El Bradia Mosque  is a small mosque in the north of the medina of Tunis, in Bab Souika suburb.

Localization
It can be found in 1 Bab Saadoun Street.

Etymology
The mosque got its name from the saddle makers who used to work near it.

History 
It was built in the 15th century, during the Hafsid era.

References 

Mosques in Tunis
15th-century mosques